"Heat Wave" is a 1963 song written by the Holland–Dozier–Holland songwriting team. It was first made popular by the Motown vocal group Martha and the Vandellas. Released as a 45 rpm single on July 9, 1963, on the Motown subsidiary Gordy label, it hit number one on the Billboard Hot R&B chart—where it stayed for four weeks—and peaking at number 4 on the Billboard Hot 100.

It was recorded 12 years later by rock vocalist Linda Ronstadt on her Platinum-selling 1975 album Prisoner in Disguise. Ronstadt's version of the song was released as a single in September 1975, reaching number 5 in Billboard, 4 in Cash Box, and 6 in Record World. In 2010, British musician Phil Collins spent a single week (number 28) on the Billboard Adult Contemporary listing with his retooling of the song.

Martha and the Vandellas version

Background
"Heat Wave" was one of many songs written and produced by the Holland–Dozier–Holland songwriting and producing team. It was the second hit collaboration between Martha and the Vandellas and the team, with the first being "Come and Get These Memories". The lyrics of "Heat Wave" feature the song's narrator singing about a guy who has her heart "burning with desire" and "going insane" over the feeling of his love, and asking, "is this the way love's supposed to be?"  Cash Box described it as a "danceable rock-a-twister" that could return the group to the Top 20. The song is often referred to as "(Love Is Like a) Heat Wave", but the title on the label of the original 1963 single was just "Heat Wave".

Produced and composed with a gospel backbeat, jazz overtones and, doo-wop call and responsive vocals, "Heat Wave" was one of the first songs to exemplify the style of music later termed as the "Motown Sound". The single was a breakthrough hit, peaking at number 4 on the Billboard Hot 100, and at number 1 on the Billboard R&B Singles Chart. It also garnered the group's only Grammy Award nomination for Best Rhythm and Blues Recording for 1964, making the Vandellas the first Motown group ever to receive a Grammy Award nomination.

Some versions of the song have a radio edit that cuts out the repetition of the ending of the instrumental portion of the song, which is in one key, featuring the repeated saxophone and piano portion. In a version issued on the compilation Gold, the instrumental is extended as well as the ending portion, which includes Reeves singing more ad-libs while her group mates continue to sing the word "burning" repeatedly.

The success of "Heat Wave" helped popularize both Martha and the Vandellas and Holland-Dozier-Holland, while cementing Motown as a strong musical force.

The Martha and the Vandellas version was featured in the 1970 film The Boys in the Band, in a scene in which several of the characters perform an impromptu line dance to the recording. It also appeared in Brian De Palma's 1976 film Carrie and was also featured in the 1979's More American Graffiti and is included on the film’s soundtrack album. In the 1992 film Sister Act, Whoopi Goldberg sings the song (arranged by Marc Shaiman) as part of her Vegas nightclub act saluting '60s girl groups.

In a 2007 DVD entitled "The Lovin' Spoonful with John Sebastian – Do You Believe in Magic", author Sebastian illustrates how he sped up the three-chord intro from "Heat Wave" to come up with the intro to "Do You Believe in Magic".

Billboard named the song number 12 on their list of 100 Greatest Girl Group Songs.

In 2021, it was listed at No. 257 on Rolling Stone's Top 500 Best Songs.

Personnel
 Lead vocals – Martha Reeves
 Background vocals – Rosalind Ashford and Annette Beard
 Produced by Brian Holland and Lamont Dozier
 Written by Brian Holland, Lamont Dozier and Edward Holland, Jr.
 Instrumentation by the Funk Brothers:
 Richard "Pistol" Allen – drums
 James Jamerson – double bass
 Joe Hunter – piano
 Robert White – guitar
 Eddie Willis – guitar
 Andrew "Mike" Terry – baritone saxophone solo

Chart performance

Linda Ronstadt version

Background
Linda Ronstadt remade "Heat Wave" for her album Prisoner in Disguise which was recorded at The Sound Factory in Hollywood between February and June 1975 and released that October. Ronstadt's sideman Andrew Gold told Rolling Stone: "[her] band had been trying to get Linda to add it to her [live] set ...one night at a Long Island club called My Father's Place we received six encores and we'd run of tunes. One of us yelled out 'Heat Wave in D' and we did it. [The band was] awfully sloppy but the crowd really liked it.  So we kept the song in our set."

Michael Epstein the manager of My Father's Place states he was responsible for Ronstadt's singing "Heat Wave" at his club: when Ronstadt went backstage after advising the audience she and the band had no more material Epstein says he suggested Ronstadt perform "Heat Wave" writing down the lyrics and playing some chords on a guitar to help her band improvise.

According to the Rolling Stone article the perfectionism of Ronstadt's producer Peter Asher "led to many, many hours  of work on 'Heat Wave' in a process that would [likely] amuse the old-line Motown musicians involved in the almost assembly-line approach that resulted in hits including Martha and the Vandellas' 1963 recording of the song."

Although Ronstadt had made her top ten breakthrough in 1975 with remakes of the 1960s hits "You're No Good" and "When Will I Be Loved", the lead single from Prisoner in Disguise was the original Neil Young composition "Love Is a Rose" with "Heat Wave" relegated to the B-side of the single which was released in August 1975. However pop radio disc jockeys preferred "Heat Wave", which rose to a number 5 peak in November 1975, while "Love Is a Rose" received support from C&W radio, reaching number 5 on the C&W chart in Billboard magazine.

Personnel

Linda Ronstadt – lead vocals
Andrew Gold – acoustic guitars, electric guitars, drums, piano, ARP String Ensemble, congas, background vocals, hand claps
Kenny Edwards – bass, background vocals
Peter Asher – hand claps

Chart performance

Phil Collins version

Background
In 2010, Phil Collins remade "Heat Wave" for his cover album, Going Back, with the track serving as lead single, the first Phil Collins' single release in over five years. Except for the Carole King/Gerry Goffin-penned title cut and that team's "Some of Your Lovin'"—both Dusty Springfield hits—and also Collins' take on Curtis Mayfield's "Talking About My Baby", Going Back comprised Collins' remakes of Motown classics with the session personnel featuring three members of The Funk Brothers, Bob Babbitt, Ray Monette, and Eddie Willis; Collins would say: "To be able to have three of the surviving Funk Brothers play on all the tracks was unbelievable. There was one moment when they were tracking 'Heat Wave' that I experienced a wave of happiness and wonder that this was actually happening to me!".

On 31 July 2010, Atlantic Records unveiled the music video to support Collins' "Heat Wave" with the singer shown performing the song with a large ensemble of musicians and backing vocalists who performed with him during several showcases promoting the album in the summer of 2010.

Track listing
"(Love Is Like a) Heatwave" – 2:53
"Never Dreamed You'd Leave in Summer" – 2:59

Personnel
Phil Collins – vocals, drums, percussion, keyboards
Eddie Willis – guitar
Ray Monette – guitar
Bob Babbitt – bass
Graeme Blevins – tenor saxophone
Phil Todd – baritone saxophone and solo
Guy Barker and Tom Rees-Roberts – trumpets
John Aram – trombone
Connie Jackson and Lynne Fiddmont – backing vocals

Chart performance

See also
 List of number-one R&B singles of 1963 (U.S.)

Notes

References

External links
 
 

1963 songs
1963 singles
1972 singles
1975 singles
2010 singles
Martha and the Vandellas songs
Linda Ronstadt songs
Phil Collins songs
Songs written by Holland–Dozier–Holland
Song recordings produced by Brian Holland
Song recordings produced by Lamont Dozier
Gordy Records singles
Columbia Records singles
Asylum Records singles
Atlantic Records singles